Locmaria may refer to several places in France:
Locmaria, a commune in the Morbihan department
Locmaria-Grand-Champ, a commune in the Morbihan department
Locmaria-Berrien, a commune in the Finistère department
Locmaria-Plouzané, a commune in the Finistère department